Briggs Islet is a small granite island, with an area of 3.4 ha, in south-eastern Australia.  It is part of Tasmania’s Great Dog Island Group, lying in eastern Bass Strait between Flinders and Cape Barren Islands in the Furneaux Group.  It is a conservation area.  The island is part of the Franklin Sound Islands Important Bird Area, identified as such by BirdLife International because it holds over 1% of the world populations of six bird species.

Fauna
Recorded breeding seabird and wader species are little penguin, white-faced storm-petrel, Pacific gull, silver gull, sooty oystercatcher, Caspian tern, crested tern and white-fronted tern.

See also

 List of islands of Tasmania

References

Furneaux Group
Protected areas of Tasmania
Important Bird Areas of Tasmania